Maria Volodymyrivna Protsenko (born 23 February 1946) is a Ukrainian architect known for her role as the chief architect for Pripyat during the Chornobyl disaster.

Early life
Protsenko was born to Sino-Russian parents in China, and her Chinese birth name is Mu Lan. Her father, Xu Xiang Shui (nicknamed Volodya), became addicted to opium after the deaths of her older brothers to diphtheria. Protsenko's mother left him and, along with Protsenko, moved to Kazakhstan, where Protsenko studied in the Institute of Roads and Transport in Ust-Kamenogorsk. In Kazakhstan, she met and married Viktor Protsenko, a Ukrainian from Poltava. Towards the end of the 1970s, the couple moved to Ukraine, eventually settling in Pripyat in 1978.

Career

Architectural career at Pripyat 
In 1979, Protsenko became the chief architect for Pripyat, though she was barred from joining the Communist Party because of her Chinese birth. Working under Dipromisto, she supervised the city's expansion. During the 1986 Chernobyl disaster, her knowledge and her access to city maps put her in charge of the city's evacuation. She was one of the last people to leave Pripyat. After its evacuation, she worked with the KGB to seal off the city.

Later life and career 
In 1991, she fell ill to paraparesis (weakness of the legs). Her husband Viktor died in 2005. The deaths of her husband, and also her son, was attributed to Chernobyl by Protsenko's daughter Natalia. As of 2019, Protsenko is teaching art, design and architecture at the Art Institute for Decorative Modelling and Design in Kyiv. 

In November 2021, a crowdfunding campaign was initiated for her medical expenses related to gastric and gallbladder tumor. On April 3rd, 2022, Maria appeared in a YouTube video from Yes Theory. The hosts met up with her in a refugee center in Poland, following her and her families escape from Ukraine during the 2022 Russian Invasion of Ukraine. During the interview, she lamented the war, and urged for peace. In an Instagram post, Yes Theory stated that Protsenko and her daughter made it safely to Germany.

References

1946 births
Living people
Soviet architects
Ukrainian people of Chinese descent
Kazakhstani emigrants to Ukraine
Soviet people of Chinese descent
People from Pripyat
People associated with the Chernobyl disaster
Ukrainian women educators
Ukrainian refugees
Ukrainian emigrants to Germany